Alston’s Corner is an 8 storey Edwardian building located on the corner of Elizabeth Street and Collins St in CBD of Melbourne, Australia. It is currently used as residential apartments, now named Cashmore Apartments.

There is a plaque on the building attesting that it stands on the site of the first brick building erected in Melbourne after the first land sales in 1836.

Description 
Alston's Corner occupies a landmark corner position, emphasised by an almost circular projecting oriel window on the corner, topped by a cupola. The street sides feature bay windows set within tall arched elements, separated by tall narrow windows, giving the building a vertical emphasis. The attic level and first floor feature green-glazed columnettes, and the fourth floor features half-domed balconettes with cast-iron railings, with Art Nouveau decoration below. Column capitals and the tops of piers also feature Art Nouveau detailing. There is a prominent projecting cornice at the fifth floor, with a double level mansard roof above. Flat areas of wall are in red brick, while all other details are in painted cement render.

History 
Tobacconist Henry Alston commissioned architect Nahum Barnet to design the building, which was formally known as Altson's Building (and later in the 20th century as Brunton Chambers), but gained its nickname from Alston's tobacconist shop, which occupied the prime corner position for many years.

The building was constructed in 1903–1904 by master builders Clements Langford Pty Ltd, and extended by one bay on Collins Street in 1908. The architect, Nahum Barnet, was a respected and prolific architect of the time, designing a range of commercial, residential and religious works from the 1880s into the 1910s, with many examples in the CBD.

The building was substantially altered in the 1950s, with the removal of the corner oriel and cupola, the top cornice and the balconettes, and the painting of the brickwork. In the 1970s, the upper floors were sealed off, leaving only the basement, ground and mezzanine floors in use as retail spaces.

In 1999-2000, architect Kenneth Edelstein was engaged to restore the building, with the help of conservation architect Nigel Lewis, and convert the upper floors to apartments. The oriel bay windows, cupola, cornice, balconettes and Art Nouveau decoration were reconstructed in lightweight pre-cast materials matching the original in appearance. The single rooftop mansard floor artist's studio was replaced with two mansard floors. The program included retail space at basement and ground level, one or two bedroom apartments on levels 1 to 5, and two apartments spread over the mansard floors.

References

Fischer, P, 2007. Vintage Melbourne. 1st ed. Bowden SA: East Street Publications.
Goad, P, 2012. The Encyclopaedia of Australian Architecture. New York: Cambridge University Press.
Goad, P, 1999. A Guide to Melbourne Architecture. Sydney: Watermark Press.
Lewis, Miles: "Barnet, Nahum", in Australian Dictionary of Biography, 2005
Edelstein, K. H. "Cashmore Apartments"

External links 
Walking Melbourne

Buildings and structures in Melbourne City Centre
Residential buildings completed in 1913
1913 establishments in Australia
Elizabeth Street, Melbourne
Collins Street, Melbourne